Kali Kumar Tongchangya is an Indian politician who serves as Chairman of Chakma Autonomous District Council.

References 

Indian politicians